RO-5166017 is a drug developed by Hoffmann-La Roche which acts as a potent and selective agonist for the trace amine-associated receptor 1, with no significant activity at other targets. This is important for the study of the TAAR1 receptor, as while numerous other compounds are known which act as TAAR1 agonists, such as methamphetamine, MDMA and 3-iodothyronamine, all previously known TAAR1 agonists are either weak and rapidly metabolized (endogenous ligands), or have strong pharmacological activity at other targets (amphetamines, thyronamines), making it very difficult to assess which effects are due to TAAR1 activation. The discovery of RO-5166017 allows purely TAAR1 mediated effects to be studied, and in animal studies it was shown to prevent stress-induced hyperthermia and block dopamine-dependent hyperlocomotion, as well as blocking the hyperactivity which would normally be induced by an NMDA antagonist. The experiment was done in dopamine transporter knockout mice, and since TAAR1 affects the dopamine transporter, the results could be very different in humans.

See also
 EPPTB
 O-Phenyl-3-iodotyramine

References 

TAAR1 agonists
Oxazolines